Villaflor may refer to:

Places
Villaflor, Ávila, a municipality in Spain
, a town in the municipality of Muelas del Pan, Spain

People with the surname
Arron Villaflor (born 1990), Filipino actor
Azucena Villaflor (1924–1977), Argentine activist
Ben Villaflor (born 1952), Filipino boxer